The Women's Moderation Union, headed by  M. Louise Gross, helped the Women's Christian Temperance Union's insistence that it spoke for American women. When she heard the WCTU president make that assertion before the United States Congress in an effort to enhance its power and influence, Gross decided that those women who sought the repeal of prohibition needed a vehicle through which their voice of opposition could be heard.

Although the libertarian orientation of the Women's Moderation Union did not resonate well with some women, Gross' organization was successful in mobilizing and giving visibility to many women who opposed the national prohibition of alcoholic beverages.

Prohibition in the United States
Political organizations based in the United States